Actitis is a small genus of waders, comprising just two very similar bird species.

Taxonomy
The genus Actitis was introduced in 1811 by the German zoologist Johann Illiger. The genus name is from Ancient Greek aktites, "coast-dweller" from akte, "coast". The type species is the common sandpiper. The genus is sister to the genus Tringa that contains the shanks and the tattlers.

The genus contains two species:
 Common sandpiper, Actitis hypoleucos, of Eurasia
 Spotted sandpiper, Actitis macularia of North America

Description
These are both small  migratory waders, greyish brown on top and white underneath, with a distinctive stiff-winged flight low over the water. The plumages are very similar, apart from spotted sandpipers' distinctive breeding plumage, and suspected out-of-range vagrants must be carefully observed for identification to species.

Both species have short yellow or yellowish legs and a medium bill.  These are not gregarious birds and are seldom seen in large flocks.

They nest on the ground, and their habitat is near fresh water. These birds forage on the ground or in water, picking up food by sight. They may also catch insects in flight. They eat insects, crustaceans and other invertebrates.

Actitis is part of the shank-tattler-phalarope clade and less closely related to the calidrid sandpipers. Based on the degree of DNA sequence divergence and putative shank and phalarope fossils from around the Oligocene/Miocene boundary some 23-22 million years ago, presumably Actitis diverged from its closest relatives in the Late Oligocene; given the much higher diversity of the prehistoric members of the group in Eurasia it is likely that they originated there, possibly being isolated as the remains of the Turgai Sea dried up, which happened just around this time.

The Late Pliocene fossil described as Actitis balcanica  appears to be actually from some indeterminate charadriid.

Footnotes

References

 Mlíkovský, Jirí (2002): Cenozoic Birds of the World, Part 1: Europe. Ninox Press, Prague.  
 
  Supplementary Material

 
Bird genera